Doryfera is a genus of hummingbird in the family Trochilidae.

Species
The genus contains the following species:

References

 
 
Taxonomy articles created by Polbot